Charletonia samosensis is a species of mite belonging to the family Erythraeidae, first described from Greece.

References

Further reading
Haitlinger, Ryszard. "Charletonia postojnensis n. sp. and the first record of Hauptmannia podorasensis Haitlinger, 2007 (Acari: Prostigmata: Erythraeidae) from Slovenia." Zeszyty Naukowe Uniwersytetu Przyrodniczego we Wrocławiu, Biologia i Hodowla Zwierząt 62.580 (2011): 27–32.
Hakimitabar, Masoud, et al. "Charletonia behshahriensis (Acari: Erythraeidae) from Iran with a key to species with two intercoxalae II and III." International Journal of Acarology 40.8 (2014): 595–604.

Trombidiformes
Arachnids of Europe